Fock is a surname. Notable people with the surname include:

 Bror Fock (1888–1964), Swedish long-distance runner
 Carin Fock (1888–1931), first wife of Hermann Göring
 Dirk Fock (1858–1941), Dutch politician
 Gorch Fock (author), pseudonym of Johann Wilhelm Kinau (1880-1916), German author 
 Jenő Fock (1916–2001), Hungarian Chairman of the Council of Ministers from 1967 to 1975
 Josephine Fock (born 1965), Danish politician
 Metta Fock (1765–1810), Swedish convicted murderer
 Vladimir Fock (1898–1974), Soviet physicist
 Willemijn Fock (1942–2021), Dutch art historian
 Wim Fock (1909–1984), Dutch boxer

See also 
 Fock family
 Fredson Tavares, a footballer with Cape Verde, known as "Fock"
 Fok (surname), a list of people
 Fuck